Al Campana (1926-2009) was a professional American football player who played running back for four seasons for the Chicago Bears and Chicago Cardinals.

References

1926 births
2009 deaths
American football running backs
Chicago Bears players
Chicago Cardinals players
Youngstown State Penguins football players
People from Hubbard, Ohio